DYIN (1107 AM) Bombo Radyo is a radio station owned and operated by Bombo Radyo Philippines through its licensee People's Broadcasting Service. Its studio is located at Bombo Radyo Broadcast Center, Oyo Torong St. cor. J. Magno St., Kalibo, and its transmitter is located at Brgy. Bachaw Sur, Kalibo.

References

Radio stations in Aklan
Radio stations established in 1997
News and talk radio stations in the Philippines